Nathalie Tauziat (born 17 October 1967) is a French former professional tennis player. She was the runner-up in women's singles at the 1998 Wimbledon Championships and runner-up in the women's doubles at the 2001 US Open partnering  Kimberly Po-Messerli. She reached a career-high ranking of world No. 3 in both singles and doubles.

She currently coaches her countrywoman Harmony Tan and Canadian tennis player Bianca Andreescu.

Early life
Tauziat was born in Bangui, Central African Republic, where she lived for the first eight years of her life. She is a first cousin of Didier Deschamps, former captain and current manager of the French football team. About a week after Tauziat reached the Wimbledon final on 4 July 1998, Deschamps led France to win the World Cup on 12 July 1998.

Career
Tauziat turned professional in 1984. She won her first singles title in 1990. She reached her only Grand Slam singles final at the 1998 Wimbledon Championships, beating Haruka Inoue, Iva Majoli, Julie Halard-Decugis, Samantha Smith, Lindsay Davenport and Natasha Zvereva before losing to Jana Novotná. Her appearance in this final was the first by a Frenchwoman since Suzanne Lenglen in 1925.

Tauziat was runner-up with partner Kimberly Po in the 2001 US Open women's doubles final, losing to the team of Lisa Raymond and Rennae Stubbs. She and partner Alexandra Fusai were doubles runners-up at the 1997 and 1998 Chase Championships. She was also part of the 1997 French Fed Cup team, which won its first title in the history of the competition.

Tauziat reached her career-high singles ranking of world No. 3 at the age of 32 years and 6 months in the spring of 2000, making her the oldest woman to debut in the top three and the fourth oldest to be ranked in the top three. She retired from the WTA Tour after the 2003 French Open, after having played only doubles in 2002 and 2003. Tauziat won 8 singles titles and 25 doubles titles on the WTA Tour in her career.

She wrote a book with the title "Les Dessous du tennis féminin" (published in 2001 in French) in which she gave her insights about life on the women's professional tennis circuit. In 2004 Tauziat received a state honour – le chevalier de la Légion d'honneur – from French President Jacques Chirac for her contributions to international tennis. She was an official WTA Tour mentor to French tennis player Marion Bartoli, beginning in 2003.

Personal
Tauziat married Ramuncho Palaurena on 16 July 2005. The couple have three daughters, one born in 2005 and twin girls in June 2009.

Major finals

Grand Slam tournaments

Singles: 1 (1 runner-up)

Women's doubles: 1 (1 runner-up)

Year-end championships

Doubles: 2 (2 runner-ups)

WTA career finals

Singles: 22 (8–14)

Doubles: 57 (25–32)

ITF finals

Singles (3–0)

Doubles (2–2)

Grand Slam performance timelines

Singles

Doubles

See also
 Performance timelines for all female tennis players who reached at least one Grand Slam final

References

External links
 
 
 

1967 births
Chevaliers of the Légion d'honneur
French female tennis players
Hopman Cup competitors
Living people
Olympic tennis players of France
People from Bangui
Sportspeople from Var (department)
Tennis players at the 1988 Summer Olympics
Tennis players at the 1992 Summer Olympics
Tennis players at the 1996 Summer Olympics
Sportspeople from Pyrénées-Atlantiques
Central African Republic sportswomen
Central African Republic emigrants to France